Atanas Drenovichki (born 19 June 1990 in Gotse Delchev) is a Bulgarian football defender who plays for Slivnishki geroi.

He plays in defence, originally on the left side and he can also play on the right side and in center.

Career
Born in Gotse Delchev Drenovichki started play football in local team Pirin. In June 2008 he moved to Slavia Sofia and signed his first professional contract.

International career
In the beginning of 2010, Drenovichki was called up to the Bulgaria under-21 team for the first time, making his competitive debut on 3 March 2010, in a 0–2 loss against Montenegro U21.

External links
 

1990 births
Living people
Bulgarian footballers
Association football defenders
First Professional Football League (Bulgaria) players
PFC Slavia Sofia players
PFC Ludogorets Razgrad players
PFC Vidima-Rakovski Sevlievo players
PFC Pirin Gotse Delchev players